Haiming may refer to:

Haiming, Austria
Haiming, Germany